Jones Street is a historic street  in Savannah, Georgia, United States. It is named for Major John Jones, an aide to brigadier general Lachlan McIntosh at the 1779 siege of Savannah during the American Revolutionary War.

It lies near the center of the Savannah Historic District. The street name changes at Bull Street, a north–south thoroughfare, becoming East Jones Street and West Jones Street, respectively, and they border two of Bull Street's southernmost squares.

Jones Street has been described as one of the most charming streets in America. Several of its homes were built by John Scudder, who — with his brother, Ephraim — also built Scudder's Row on Monterey Square.

The street is interrupted between Martin Luther King Jr. Boulevard and Montgomery Street by an off-ramp from Interstate 16, allowing direct access to Savannah's Historic District at Montgomery Street.

In a 2016 study, Jones Street was one of several Savannah streets considered to be a "complete street" connection that "provide[d] safe, comfortable and convenient movement for pedestrians, bikes, vehicles, and alternative modes of transportation."

Jones Street passes through six wards (from west to east): Currie Town, Pulaski, Jasper, Lafayette, Troup and Bartow.

Notable buildings

Below is a selection of notable buildings on Jones Street, many constructed for Eliza Ann Jewett (1779–1856). The majority of the buildings were erected in the 1850s, although another construction spike occurred in the 1880s. From west to east:

West Jones Street

East Jones Street

References

External link
A walk along Jones Street, from Tattnall Street near its western end to East Broad Street at its eastern end, and back – YouTube, December 13, 2020 (4K)
"Is Jones Street Really the Prettiest Street in Savannah?" – SavannahFirstTimer.com

Roads in Savannah, Georgia
Tourist attractions in Savannah, Georgia
Streets in Georgia (U.S. state)